Nops branicki is a spider species found in French Guiana.

See also 
 List of Caponiidae species

References

External links 

Fauna of French Guiana
Spiders of South America
Spiders described in 1874
Caponiidae